Sarantis Tselebakis (born 2 November 2005) is a Greek professional footballer who plays as a midfielder for Super League club Volos.

References

2005 births
Living people
Greek footballers
Super League Greece 2 players
Super League Greece players
Xanthi F.C. players
Volos N.F.C. players
Association football midfielders